Mitro-Ayupovskoye (Miträy-Äyüp) is a rural locality (a selo) in Chekmagushevsky District, Bashkortostan, Russia. The population was 457 as of 2010. There are 2 streets.

Geography 
Mitro-Ayupovskoye is located 29 km southwest of Chekmagush (the district's administrative centre) by road. Staropuchkakovo is the nearest rural locality.

References 

Rural localities in Chekmagushevsky District